Baháʼí marriage is union of a man and a woman. Its purpose is mainly spiritual and is to foster harmony, fellowship and unity between the two partners. The Baháʼí teachings on marriage call it a fortress for well-being and salvation and place marriage and the family as the foundation of the structure of human society.

Spiritual nature 

The Baháʼí teachings on marriage see it as an eternal bond that survives past the lives of the partners in the physical life, and into the spiritual worlds. Thus the teachings stress that during courting the partners must take the utmost care to become acquainted with each other's character. Furthermore, the husband and wife should be united not only physically, but also spiritually, so that they can improve the spiritual life of each other, and that they can spiritually advance towards God.

Engagement 

The parents cannot interfere with the selection of the person their child wants to marry, but marriage has been conditioned, once the couple's wish is known, upon the permission of their parents. The purpose of this law is to foster unity between the two families, since the Baháʼí teachings see marriage and the family as the foundation of the structure and society, and having disunity between two families is not conducive to that. The consent of all parents is needed even if one of the partners is not a Baháʼí.

Baháʼís see this aspect of Baháʼí marriage as combining marriages practices from the East and West; in the East arranged marriage is common, and in the west marriages sometimes go forward with no input from the parents. The Baháʼí marriage gives full freedom of the individuals to select their partner, but places certain gratitude and respect to the parents.

"A couple should study each other's character and spend time getting to know each other before they decide to marry, and when they do marry it should be with the intention of establishing an eternal bond."

Waiting period
The time between the official public announcement of the marriage and the wedding ceremony should not exceed 95 days. The 95-day period of engagement is currently applicable only to Persian believers.

Ceremony 

The Baháʼí marriage ceremony is done differently in each culture. The only compulsory part of the wedding is the reading of the wedding vows prescribed by Baháʼu'lláh which both the groom and the bride recite:

We will all, verily, abide by the Will of God. in the presence of two witnesses to be recorded through a Baháʼí Local Spiritual Assembly. Legal recognition depends on the civil laws of the country.

Most Baháʼí marriage ceremonies consist of the reading of Baháʼí writings, prayers and music followed by a talk about the spiritual nature of Baháʼí marriage, and then the reading of the vows.

Laws 

There are a number of laws that concern Baháʼí marriage.

Marriage is not obligatory, but is highly recommended. 
Only married couples may engage in sexual activity.
Both partners must be at least 15 years of age at the time of engagement. (The civil laws of their country must be obeyed)
Marriage is conditional on the consent of both parties and their parents. 
Marriage with non-Baháʼís is permitted (see Interreligious marriage).
The period of engagement must not exceed ninety-five days (not currently universally applicable).
A marriage is conditional on the payment of a dowry. The payment, if the husband lives in a city, is nineteen mithqáls (approx. 2.22 troy ounces) of pure gold, and if the husband lives in a village the same amount in silver. However, it is preferable to content oneself with the lowest level that is nineteen mithqáls of silver for both city and village dwellers.  Baháʼu'lláh also set a maximum permitted dowry amount of 95 mithqáls (approx. 11.1 troy ounces). (Not currently universally applicable)
Transgender people are permitted to marry if they have medically transitioned and undergone sex reassignment surgery (SRS). After SRS, the transition is considered complete and the husband or wife may have a Baháʼí marriage.

Children and parenting

Following the natural and appropriate extension of the union of marriage, children, whether adopted or biological, should be raised in this same spiritual atmosphere. Formal duties exist between parents and children (of education and obedience, training and respect.) Second to discovering God for oneself is respect for one's parents. Reversing the degradation of women and children is a subject of much attention in the Baháʼí Faith.

Notes

References 

 Relationship between Husband and Wife by the Universal House of Justice, 1980.
 Violence Against Women and Children by Universal House of Justice, 1993.
 Notes on Baháʼí population in India by Charles Nolley and William Garlington, 1997.

External links
 Bahai.org: Family Life and Children

Marriage
Marriage and religion